The Nesting (also known as Phobia and Massacre Mansion) is a 1981 American supernatural horror film directed and co-written by Armand Weston, and starring Robin Groves, Michael Lally, John Carradine and Gloria Grahame in her final film role. Its plot follows an agoraphobic novelist who rents a rural mansion that she comes to find is haunted.

While not prosecuted for obscenity, the film was seized and confiscated in the UK under Section 3 of the Obscene Publications Act 1959 during the video nasty panic

Plot
New York City novelist Lauren Cochran (Robin Groves) suffers from agoraphobia and, in a bid to overcome her ailment, she rents a stately Victorian mansion in the country from a scientist, Daniel Griffith (Michael Lally) and his ailing grandfather, Colonel Lebrun (John Carradine). A series of strange occurrences begin once Lauren moves in; when she meets Col. Lebrun, he suffers a stroke at the sight of her, and she suspects that the house may be haunted after suffering bizarre dreams of women lounging around the house. She also feels she has seen the home before, and realizes an illustration of it appears on one of her novels, entitled The Nesting.

One day, while investigating the turret at the peak of the house, Lauren becomes trapped outside on the window ledge, and has a vision of a woman inside. Her psychiatrist, Dr. Webber, arrives at the house, and is killed while attempting to save her. Several days later, Lauren is attacked by Frank Beasley, a handyman, at the house. Amidst the attack, he begins to levitate, and flees the house in terror; he has a vision of two women's corpses lying in his truck, and he flees into the woods, and stumbles into a pond, where he is dragged under by ghostly hands and drowns.

Lauren, bothered by the events occurring in the house, visits a local man, Abner Welles, to ask about the house after having heard Frank mention his name. Abner, a drunk with a bad reputation in town, becomes erratic and violent when she inquires about the house's history, and chases her away in his car. The two get into a car accident, and Lauren flees on foot and hides in a barn. Abner finds her, and attempts to attack her with a pitchfork, but it is torn from his hands by an unseen force. Lauren then stabs him through the head with a scythe, killing him.

Lauren's visions in the house become increasingly bizarre, and she begins having precognitive dreams. It is revealed by Col. Lebrun to Daniel that the home was a former brothel during World War II, and that Frank and Abner murdered several prostitutes and soldiers in the home and dumped their bodies in the nearby pond.

At the house, Lauren has an intense hallucination, in which she meets Florinda (Gloria Grahame), the madame of the brothel, and it is revealed that she is Florinda's granddaughter and, as an infant, was the lone survivor of the murders in the home. At the end of the film, she experiences a vivid hallucination in which her manuscript begins burning, and she witnesses Frank's truck crash into the house, and catch fire. At the end of the vision, she comes back to reality, and stumbles out of the house at dawn.

Cast

Production 
The film was primarily shot on location at the Armour-Stiner House at 45 West Clinton Avenue in Irvington, New York.

Release
The film was given a limited theatrical release in the United States by William Mishkin Motion Pictures beginning in May 1981.

Home media
The film was later released on VHS by Warner Home Video in 1984.

The film was released on DVD and Blu-ray by Blue Underground in June 2011, and as a DVD/Blu-ray Mediabook by German company Motion Picture in May 2014. The latter edition features both a 103-minute and a 99-minute cut.

Critical reception 

Candice Russell, film and theater writer for the Fort Lauderdale News, described the film as a "nifty Gothic thriller" with director Armand Weston having "a firm hand on his material except for a prolonged chase near film's end". TV Guide awarded the film 1/5 stars, calling it "an intriguing effort that effectively combines traditional haunted-house chills with a more modern emphasis on gore." Kurt Dahlke from DVD Talk gave the film a negative review, calling it "[an] under-the-radar 1980s potboiler". Dahlke criticized the film's lack of chills, "slo-mo sleuthing", and Loomis' character.
Brett Gallman from Oh, the Horror! wrote, "The Nesting sort of drags in general; it’s certainly too long at 103 minutes and is wildly uneven. When it wants to be a straight-up haunted house horror show, it works well; the score is definitely a high point when the film is in this mode, as the frenzied music shrieks to create tension and mood. I suppose the main problem is that it just doesn’t want to be that type of film enough."

References

External links
 
 
 

1981 films
1981 horror films
American supernatural horror films
Films shot in New York (state)
Films set in country houses
Video nasties
1980s English-language films
1980s American films